European Foundation may refer to:
 European Foundation (think tank)
 European Foundation Project